Claoxylon is a flowering plant genus in the spurge family, Euphorbiaceae, comprising dioecious subshrubs to small trees. It was first described as a genus in 1824. The genus is distributed in paleotropical areas: Madagascar through South and Southeast Asia, Malesia to Melanesia, Hawaii, and Australia. Half of the species are in Malesia.  According to a molecular phylogenetic study by Wurdack, Hoffmann & Chase (2005), Claoxylon is sister to Erythrococca (50 species, Africa), and together they form the top of a Hennigian comb-like phylogeny.

The genus Claoxylon is usually easily recognizable because the dried leaves in herbariums of most species are rough (few are smooth).

Species
{{columns-list|colwidth=30em|
 Claoxylon abbreviatum - Java, Bali, Lombok, Timor, Flores, Sulawesi
 Claoxylon affine - Java, Bali, Lombok, Timor, Flores
 Claoxylon albicans - Philippines
 Claoxylon albiflorum - Bismarck Archipelago
 Claoxylon angustifolium - Queensland
 Claoxylon anomalum - Western Ghats of SW India
 Claoxylon arboreum - Philippines
 Claoxylon attenuatum - Sabah
 Claoxylon australe - Queensland, New South Wales
 Claoxylon bicarpellatum - Papua New Guinea
 Claoxylon biciliatum - Vanuatu
 Claoxylon brachyandrum - Philippines, Sabah, Sulawesi
 Claoxylon capillipes - Papua New Guinea, Flores
 Claoxylon carinatum - Kalimantan Timur
 Claoxylon carolinianum - Caroline Islands
 Claoxylon carrii - Papua New Guinea
 Claoxylon centenarium - Ogasawara-shoto (Bonin Islands)
 Claoxylon colfsii - Sumbawa
 Claoxylon collenettei - Rapa-Iti
 Claoxylon coriaceolanatum - Papua New Guinea
 Claoxylon crassipes - Philippines
 Claoxylon crassivenium - Philippines
 Claoxylon cuneatum - Western New Guinea
 Claoxylon decaryanum - Madagascar
 Claoxylon dolichostachyum - Réunion
 Claoxylon echinospermum - Fiji
 Claoxylon ellipticum - Philippines
 Claoxylon erythrophyllum - E Indonesia
 Claoxylon euphorbioides - Philippines
 Claoxylon extenuatum - Bougainville
 Claoxylon fallax - Fiji, Tonga
 Claoxylon flavum - Madagascar
 Claoxylon fulvescens - Papua New Guinea, Sulawesi
 Claoxylon gillisonii - Vanuatu
 Claoxylon glabrifolium - Java, Bali, Lombok, Timor, Flores
 Claoxylon glandulosum - Réunion
 Claoxylon goodenoviense - D'Entrecasteaux Islands
 †Claoxylon grandifolium - Mauritius, Réunion but extinct
 Claoxylon gymnadenum - Bougainville
 Claoxylon hainanense - Hainan
 Claoxylon hillii - New Guinea, N Australia
 Claoxylon hirsutellum - Kalimantan Timur
 Claoxylon hosei - Sarawak
 Claoxylon humbertii - Madagascar
 Claoxylon indicum - S China, SE Asia, New Guinea, Andaman & Nicobar Islands, Christmas Island
 Claoxylon insigne - Sarawak
 Claoxylon insulanum - New Caledonia, Loyalty Islands
 Claoxylon kaievskii - Solomon Islands, Santa Cruz Islands
 Claoxylon khasianum - West Bengal, Bangladesh, Assam
 Claoxylon kinabaluense - Sabah
 Claoxylon kingii - S Thailand, Perak
 Claoxylon kotoense - Taiwan
 Claoxylon lambiricum - Sarawak
 Claoxylon ledermannii - Papua New Guinea
 Claoxylon linostachys - Mauritius
 Claoxylon longifolium - Assam, SE Asia, New Guinea, Caroline Islands
 Claoxylon longipetiolatum - Sikkim, Bhutan, Assam, Myanmar
 Claoxylon longiracemosum - Palau
 Claoxylon lutescens - New Guinea
 Claoxylon macranthum - Mauritius, Madagascar
 Claoxylon mananarense - Madagascar
 Claoxylon marianum - Mariana Islands
 Claoxylon medullosum - Madagascar
 Claoxylon microcarpum - Papua New Guinea
 Claoxylon monoicum - Madagascar
 Claoxylon muscisilvae - Papua New Guinea
 Claoxylon neoebudicum - Vanuatu, Santa Cruz Islands, Fiji 
 Claoxylon nervosum - Papua New Guinea
 Claoxylon nigtanig - Bougainville
 Claoxylon nubicola - Papua New Guinea
 Claoxylon oblanceolatum - Philippines
 Claoxylon oliganthum - Thailand
 Claoxylon ooumuense - Nuku Hiva
 Claoxylon papuae - Papua New Guinea
 Claoxylon parviflorum - Réunion, Rodrigues Island
 Claoxylon paucinerve - Papua New Guinea
 Claoxylon perrieri - Madagascar
 Claoxylon physocarpum - Sumatra
 Claoxylon platyphyllum - Papua New Guinea
 Claoxylon porphyrostemon - Papua New Guinea
 Claoxylon praetermissum - Sabah
 Claoxylon pseudoinsulanum - Kalimantan Timur
 Claoxylon psilogyne  - Vanuatu
 Claoxylon pubescens - Philippines
 Claoxylon purpureum - Philippines, Sulawesi
 Claoxylon putii - Thailand Claoxylon racemiflorum - Réunion 
 Claoxylon raymondianum - Madagascar
 Claoxylon rostratum - Andaman & Nicobar Islands, Myanmar
 Claoxylon rubescens - Lombok, Philippines
 Claoxylon rubrivenium - Luzon
 Claoxylon salicinum - Sabah
 Claoxylon salomonense - Papua New Guinea, D'Entrecasteaux Islands, Louisiade Archipelago, Solomon Islands
 Claoxylon samoense - Samoa
 Claoxylon sanctae-crucis - Santa Cruz Islands
 Claoxylon sandwicense - Hawaii
 Claoxylon sarasinorum - Sulawesi
 Claoxylon scabratum - New Guinea
 Claoxylon setosum - Réunion 
 Claoxylon spathulatum - Philippines
 Claoxylon stapfianum - Sarawak, Sabah
 Claoxylon subbullatum - Sabah
 Claoxylon subsessiliflorum - Vietnam, Yunnan
 Claoxylon subviride - Philippines
 Claoxylon taitense - Society Islands
 Claoxylon tenerifolium - Queensland
 Claoxylon tenuiflorum - Aceh
 Claoxylon tetracoccum - West New Guinea
 Claoxylon tsaratananae - Madagascar
 Claoxylon velutinum - Kalimantan Timur
 Claoxylon vitiense - Fiji
 Claoxylon wallichianum - Peninsular Malaysia
 Claoxylon warburgianum - Sulawesi
 Claoxylon winkleri - Kalimantan Selatan}}

Formerly included
moved to other genera (Acalypha, Croton, Discoclaoxylon, Erythrococca, Lobanilia, Macaranga, Mallotus, Micrococca, Orfilea)''

References

Acalypheae
Dioecious plants
Euphorbiaceae genera